Ardhendu Das (17 July 1910 – 26 April 2007) was an Indian cricketer. He played five first-class matches for Bengal between 1934 and 1942.

See also
 List of Bengal cricketers

References

External links
 

1910 births
2007 deaths
Indian cricketers
Bengal cricketers
People from Sylhet